Helen Landgarten (March 4, 1921 – February 23, 2011) was an American psychotherapist. Alongside Edith Kramer and Judith A. Rubin, she was one of the leading pioneers of art therapy.

Biography
Helen Barbara Trapper was born in Detroit, Michigan, March 4, 1921. She earned a Bachelor's degree at University of California, Los Angeles (Fine Arts, 1963) and a Master's degree from Goddard College (Marital and family therapy, 1972).

She was a professor and director of the Faculty of Clinical Art Therapy at Loyola Marymount University in Los Angeles, California. She worked as an art psychotherapist in the psychiatric department of the Cedars-Sinai Medical Center. As an honorary member of the American Professional Association of Art Therapists, she contributed to the spread of art therapy first in the US and increasingly in Europe and around the world. Landgarten led numerous workshops in Germany, Sweden, Russia, Israel, South Africa and Brazil. In addition, she wrote several books, of which two were translated into German. The Helen B. Landgarten Art Therapy Clinic at Loyola Marymount University was founded in 2007.

In her first book, entitled Clinical Art Therapy, Landgarten conveys her wealth of experience gained through decades of practice. This fundamental work shows the full scope of application of the therapy form while working with all age groups in the most diverse settings.

In her second book, Art Therapy as Family Therapy, the author deals exclusively with art therapy for families. Case studies of various diagnoses are structured in terms of developmental chronology and show the conclusive combination of both forms of therapy, founded on a common, partnership-based level of argumentation for parents, children and even grandparents. The collaborative work within the framework of family therapy forms the basis for the analysis of unconscious messages and thus the prerequisite for understanding and change.

In 1942, she married Nathan Landgarten. They had two children. Landgardten died in Los Angeles, February 23, 2011, after a stroke.

Selected works
 Group art therapy format with children of holocaust survivors, 1981
 Clinical art therapy : a comprehensive guide., 1981
 Ten Year Follow-Up Survey on the Status of Art Therapy in the Greater Los Angeles Area, 1984
 The Artist in Each of Us, 1985
 Family art psychotherapy : a clinical guide and casebook, 1987
 Klinische Kunsttherapie : ein umfassender Leitfaden, 1990
 Adult art psychotherapy : issues and applications, 1991
 Family creative arts therapies: Past and present, 1991
 Magazine Photo Collage as a Multicultural Treatment and Assessment Technique, 1994
 Kunsttherapie als Familientherapie : ein klinischer Leitfaden mit Falldarstellungen, 2010
 Clinical Art Therapy A Comprehensive Guide, 2013
 Adult Art Psychotherapy Issues And Applications, 2013
 Clinical Art Therapy A Comprehensive Guide, 2014
 Magazine Photo Collage : a Multicultural Assessment And Treatment Technique, 2017

References

1921 births
2011 deaths
20th-century American writers
20th-century American women writers
21st-century American writers
21st-century American women writers
American psychotherapists
American non-fiction writers
Art therapists
Goddard College alumni
Loyola Marymount University faculty
University of California, Los Angeles alumni
American women academics